The NCU Junior Cup is a provincial cricket knock-out cup of the NCU jurisdiction in Ireland. The competition began in 1891 and is open to teams playing in the Sections 2 and 3 of the NCU Senior League and Section 1 of the NCU Junior League (which is made up of 2nd XI teams of senior clubs). It is sponsored by Goldblatt McGuigan.

Matches consist of one innings per side, with fifty overs bowled per innings. Where matches are interrupted or delayed because of weather, the number of overs may be reduced to a minimum of 20.

List of winners
Source: CricketEurope Ireland Archives

Summary of winners

* 11 by 2nd XI
** 3 (1 shared) by 2nd XI
† 1 by 2nd XI
†† 1 by 2nd XI

See also
NCU Senior League
NCU Senior Cup
Ulster Cup

References

CricketEurope archives

External links
 Northern Cricket Union

Irish domestic cricket competitions
Cricket in Ulster